Shono may refer to:

People
Junzo Shono (庄野 潤三 1921–2009), Japanese novelist
Haruhiko Shono (庄野 晴彦, Shōno Haruhiko, born 1960),  Japanese computer graphics artist
Yoriko Shono (笙野 頼子, Shōno Yoriko, born 1956), Japanese writer

Other
Shono (album) (Bengali: শোন! Śōna ; Listen!), Bengali-language pop album by Habib Wahid 2006
Shōno-juku (庄野宿, Shōno-juku), forty-fifth of the fifty-three stations of the Tōkaidō, located in former Ise Province